The H Line is a RapidRide bus route in Seattle, Washington, United States. It is operated by King County Metro and uses bus rapid transit features, including transit signal priority, exclusive lanes, and off-board fare payment at some stations. The  route begins in Downtown Seattle and travels south on Delridge Way and Ambaum Boulevard through West Seattle and White Center before terminating in Burien. The H Line began service on March 18, 2023, replacing route 120 after the construction of new stations and bus lanes at a cost of $154 million.

The line runs every 7 minutes during peak hours and 15 minutes off-peak, with service until midnight on weekdays and 11 p.m. on weekends. The H Line is the seventh RapidRide line to open and features stations with digital e-ink screens for real-time arrivals information, ORCA card readers, and larger shelters. It is the first RapidRide line to open under the Move Seattle program, which was funded by a levy approved in 2015.

References

External links
Official website
Route schedule and map

Bus transportation in Washington (state)
Transportation in King County, Washington
Transportation in Seattle
2023 establishments in Washington (state)
2023 in transport
King County Metro